Anne Collins may refer to:

Anne Fraser (born 1951), New Zealand politician, also known by her maiden name
Anne Collins (author), winner of Governor General's Award for English language non-fiction
Anne Collins (contralto) opera singer
Ann Collins, American artist
An Collins, 17th-century poet

See also
Collins (disambiguation)